Aveyron is a department in southern France.

Aveyron may also refer to:

 Aveyron (river), in southern France, tributary of the Tarn
 Aveyron (Loing), a river in central France, tributary of the Loing

See also 
 Avey
 Aveyard